Émile Auguste Étienne Martin Deschanel (19 November 1819, Paris – 26 January 1904, Paris) was a French author and politician, the father of Paul Deschanel, the 11th President of the French Republic.

His works include: Études sur Aristophane (1867), Le Romantisme des classiques (1882), and the controversial Catholicisme et socialisme (1850). As a result, Napoleon III forced him into exile between 1851 and 1859. He later became a professor at the Collège de France and in 1881 became a senator for life.

A street bearing his name is located in the 7th arrondissement of Paris bordering the Champ de Mars.

External links
 
 

1819 births
1904 deaths
Writers from Paris
Academic staff of the Collège de France
French life senators
French male writers
Parents of presidents of France